A circumtriple planet is a celestial mass that is hypothesized to be orbiting not only a single star but three stars at the same time. Scientists observing the star system GW Ori, which is a huge disk of dust and gases about 1,300 light years away from Earth, suspect that there may be a circumtriple planet orbiting the three stars. They observed a gap in the vast dust cloud and they hypothesize that there may be a planet in this gap. The planet itself has not been seen but its influence may explain gravitational oddities within the star system. If so, this may be the first known example of a circumtriple planet in the universe. 

By using computer modeling, some scientists believe that a Jupiter-sized planet may be able to explain the star system's rings and strange behavior, according to one account. If a circumtriple planet exists, it will be an extremely rare phenomenon in the universe. It could add to human understanding of how planets form.

Fiction 
A circumtriple planet is prominently featured in the Remembrance of Earth's Past book series. In the series, the planet of Trisolaris orbits a three-star system, and the chaotic nature of the system drives the native species of the planet to seek refuge on Earth, which has a comparatively more "stable" one-star system

References

Further reading
GW Ori: circumtriple rings and planets, Jeremy L. Smallwood, Rebecca Nealon, Cheng Chen, Rebecca G. Martin, Jiaqing Bi, Ruobing Dong, Christophe Pinte, 20 Sep 2021

Hypothetical planet types
Astronomical hypotheses